Cao Yue (born 29 October 1995) is a Chinese swimmer. She competed in the women's 400 metre freestyle event at the 2016 Summer Olympics.

References

External links
 

1995 births
Living people
Olympic swimmers of China
Swimmers at the 2016 Summer Olympics
Place of birth missing (living people)
Asian Games gold medalists for China
Medalists at the 2014 Asian Games
Asian Games medalists in swimming
Swimmers at the 2014 Asian Games
Chinese female freestyle swimmers